Vlačice is a municipality and village in Kutná Hora District in the Central Bohemian Region of the Czech Republic. It has about 300 inhabitants.

Administrative parts
The village of Výčapy is an administrative part of Vlačice.

References

Villages in Kutná Hora District